Juan José Arraya (born 20 April 1986), known as Flecha Arraya, is a professional Argentine footballer who currently plays for Atlético Patronato in the Primera B Nacional, as a striker.

External links
 BDFA profile 
 Juan José Arraya at Football Lineups
 Argentine Primera statistics at Futbol XXI  

1986 births
Living people
Sportspeople from Jujuy Province
Argentine footballers
Argentine expatriate footballers
Association football forwards
Universidad de Concepción footballers
Associação Portuguesa de Desportos players
Gimnasia y Esgrima de Jujuy footballers
Expatriate footballers in Chile
Expatriate footballers in Brazil
Chilean Primera División players
Campeonato Brasileiro Série A players